Government Brajalal College, also known as BL College, is one of the oldest institutions of higher education in Bangladesh. It is located in Khulna, a major metropolis of the country.

Govt. B L College, Khulna is an educational institution at Daulatpur in Khulna district. Babu Brajalal Chakrobarti (Shastri), a patron of education, established it first as Hindu Academy in July 1902, replicating the Hindu College that was established in Calcutta in 1816. Like the Hindu College, the Hindu Academy of Daulatpur had two branches, the Chatushpathi and the college or academy. Expenses of the Chatushpathi students including food, lodging and tuition, were borne by the institution. Only residential students were admitted at the beginning. The academy was managed by a board of trustees of whom Babu Brajalal was the chairman.
The academy has started taking classes since 27 July 1902. Classes for the first and second year students began at a time. At its inception, the academy had only two tin-shed rooms with brick-and-cement floors and fence walls. At the beginning, the academy had only  of land. Later, the Mohsin Fund donated  of land from the Saidpur estate. The estate regularly disbursed a monthly donation of Rs 50 to the academy. The academy was given affiliation by Calcutta University in 1907.

A hostel for Muslim students was built in the college campus in 1910–11. At that time, Muslim students had to attend Arabic and the Persian classes in the Muslim Hostel outside the main building of the college. Later, education minister Sher-e-Bangla A. K. Fazlul Huq issued an order to appoint a Muslim teacher for the college. The first Muslim teacher appointed on a part-time basis was Mr. Musaddar Ali.

Babu Brajalal died on 8 August 1944. The institution was named Hindu Academy after him. Later, the academy was upgraded into a college and it received the shortened name of B L College. It was affiliated first to the University of Dhaka and then to the University of Rajshani and, still later, to the National University. The college was nationalised on 1 July 1967 and it was declared a university college in 1993. It offers Honours and Masters courses in almost all subjects: Bengali, English, philosophy, political science, economics, history, Islamic history, accounting, management, physics, chemistry, zoology, botany and mathematics. From 2010 it offers Honours in sociology.

Notable faculty members
The list of notable faculty includes:
 Munier Chowdhury

See also
 Khulna University
 Khulna University of Engineering & Technology

References

External links
 Official website

Colleges in Khulna District
Colleges affiliated to National University, Bangladesh
Education in Khulna
1902 establishments in British India
Educational institutions established in 1902